Sarkuraki-ye Sefidar (also Romanized as Sarkūrakī-ye Sefīdār; also known as Sarkūrakī) is a village in Sepidar Rural District, in the Central District of Boyer-Ahmad County, Kohgiluyeh and Boyer-Ahmad Province, Iran. At the 2006 census, its population was 165, in 35 families.

References 

Populated places in Boyer-Ahmad County